Italy has competed at every celebration of the Mediterranean Games since the 1951 Mediterranean Games. As of 2013, the Italian athletes have won a total of 2147 medals as the games record.

Medal count

Below the table representing all Italians medals around the games. Till now, Italy win 2,307 medals as Games record.

Medals by sport
Update to 2013 Mediterranean Games

Athletics

See also
 Italy at the Olympics
 Italy at the Paralympics
 Italy at the Summer Universiade

References

External links
 Medals Table per Country at CIJM web site
   of the Italian National Olympic Committee